Idle Hands is the eighth album by American desert rock band Fatso Jetson, released in 2016 by Heavy Psych Sounds.

Track listing

Personnel 
 Guitars, vocals – Mario Lalli
 Guitars, vocals – Dino von Lalli
 Bass – Lawrence Lalli
 Drums, percussion – Tony Tornay III
 Keyboard, guitars, bass, vox – Mathias Schneeberger
 Vocals, Spiritual Guido – Sean Wheeler
 Vocals – Olive Zoe Lalli
 Music by – Fatso Jetson, Dino Lalli, Mario Lalli, Lawrence Lalli, Tony Tornay, Mathias Schneeberger
 Lyrics on track 2 and 9 by Sean Wheeler, all other lyrics by Mario Lalli

Production
 Recorded June 2016 at Rancho de la Luna, Joshua Tree, California; Electric Lalliland, San Pedro, California
 Mixed by Mathias Schneeberger, Donner & Blitzen Studio, Los Angeles, California
 Produced by Mathias Schneeberger & Mario Lalli

References

2016 albums
Fatso Jetson albums